Liu Jianchao (born February 23, 1964) is a Chinese diplomat and politician who is the current head of the International Liaison Department of the Chinese Communist Party, in office since June 2022. He was formerly the chief spokesperson for China's Ministry of Foreign Affairs, as well as the former director-general of its Information Department. Liu has served as Chinese ambassador to the Philippines and Indonesia.

Biography
Liu was born in Dehui, Jilin. He studied International Relations at Oxford University from 1986 to 1987 and then began work with the Ministry of Foreign Affairs in its Translation Office. He went on to hold various positions in departments and embassies, including the first secretary of the PRC embassy in the United Kingdom from 1995 to 1998, counselor at the Information Department from 1998 to 2000, and deputy director-general of the Information Department from 2001 to 2006. He was also seconded to Liaoning Province as the deputy party chief of Xingcheng from 2000 to 2001. In March 2006 it was announced that he would be replacing Kong Quan as the director-general of the Information Department as well as the chief spokesperson of the Ministry of Foreign Affairs.

During his tenure as chief spokesman for the ministry, Liu took questions on a wide variety of issues to do with China's relations with the world. For instance, interviewed about the 2008 Summer Olympics and access to the Internet from inside China, he once recognized that "some websites are difficult to access from China". In December 2008, he said that the government had a right to censor Web sites that violated the country's laws.

China's official Xinhua News Agency commented that "Liu was known for his sedate and humorous style in briefing reporters on China's foreign affairs." An example of this was his response on the shoe-throwing incident against US President Bush, where he said that the incident had given him "pause for thought" and that he would henceforth watch out for journalists taking off their shoes.

In January 2009, Liu was replaced as the director-general of the Information Department as well as the head spokesperson of the ministry by Ma Zhaoxu. At his farewell reception attended by ministry officials and journalists, Liu expressed his pleasure and gratitude at being able to participate in the Information Department's work in a period of complex and rapid changes for both China and the world. "The world is concerned about China; China also needs to understand the world. Strengthening mutual understanding and communication between China and the world is a beneficial thing."

Liu was subsequently appointed as the ambassador to the Philippines. He presented his letter of credence in March 2009.

Liu was later appointed as Chinese ambassador to Indonesia. He presented his letter of credence to President Susilo Bambang Yudhoyono on 9 March 2012.

In April 2017, Liu was named a member of the Zhejiang provincial party standing committee and the head of the provincial discipline inspection commission.

In April 2018, Liu was returned to the Office of the Central Foreign Affairs Commission, and named deputy director in September.

In June 2022, Liu was appointed head of the International Liaison Department of the Chinese Communist Party, succeeding Song Tao.

Liu was a member of the 19th Central Commission for Discipline Inspection.

References

External links
Chinese Embassy in the Philippines

1964 births
Living people
People's Republic of China politicians from Jilin
Chinese Communist Party politicians from Jilin
Ambassadors of China to the Philippines
Ambassadors of China to Indonesia
Politicians from Changchun